Clyde Henry Hamilton (February 8, 1934 – September 2, 2020) was a Senior United States circuit judge of the United States Court of Appeals for the Fourth Circuit and a former United States district judge for the United States District Court for the District of South Carolina.

Education and career

Born in Edgefield, South Carolina, Hamilton received a Bachelor of Science degree from Wofford College in 1956 and a Juris Doctor from the George Washington University Law School in 1961. He was in the United States Army as a Reserve Captain from 1956 to 1958. He was in private practice in Edgefield from 1961 to 1963, and in Spartanburg, South Carolina from 1963 to 1982.

Federal judicial service

On November 13, 1981, Hamilton was nominated by President Ronald Reagan to a seat on the United States District Court for the District of South Carolina vacated by Judge Robert F. Chapman. Hamilton was confirmed by the United States Senate on November 24, 1981, and received his commission on December 1, 1981, serving until July 31, 1991.

On June 12, 1991, President George H. W. Bush nominated Hamilton for elevation to a new seat on the United States Court of Appeals for the Fourth Circuit, created by 104 Stat. 5089. He was confirmed by the United States Senate on July 18, 1991, and received his commission on July 22, 1991. He assumed senior status on November 30, 1999. Hamilton died on September 2, 2020, aged 86.

References

Sources

1934 births
2020 deaths
20th-century American judges
21st-century American judges
George Washington University Law School alumni
Judges of the United States Court of Appeals for the Fourth Circuit
Judges of the United States District Court for the District of South Carolina
Military personnel from South Carolina
People from Edgefield, South Carolina
South Carolina lawyers
United States Army officers
United States court of appeals judges appointed by George H. W. Bush
United States district court judges appointed by Ronald Reagan
Wofford College alumni